War Heroes Stadium is a multi-purpose stadium in Sangrur, Punjab. The stadium has hosted two Kabaddi World Cups in 2010 and 2013.

In 2013, the stadium was upgraded with 7 crore for laying the synthetic athletic track at the stadium which will be constructed by the National Building Construction Company.

The stadium will have state of the art sports facilities for games like taekwondo, badminton, lawn tennis and badminton in addition to the existing disciplines of athletics, boxing and volleyball with the association Sports Authority of India.

References

External links
 architizer

Sangrur
Sports venues in Punjab, India
Kabaddi venues in India
2010 establishments in Punjab, India
Sports venues completed in 2010